Me Against the World is the third studio album by American rapper 2Pac. It was released on March 14, 1995, by Interscope. 2Pac draws lyrical inspiration from his impending prison sentence, troubles with the police, and poverty.

According to 2Pac, Me Against the World was made to show the hip-hop audience his respect for the art form. Lyrically, he intentionally tried to make the album more personal and reflective than his previous efforts. Considered by several music critics to be the best of any of his albums up to that point in his career, the album's musical production was handled by his mentor Shock G, Easy Mo Bee, Tony Pizarro, Johnny "J" and the Danish hip-hop duo Soulshock and Karlin, among others.  Me Against the World features guest appearances from rap group Dramacydal and rapper Richie Rich. 

Released while Tupac was imprisoned, Me Against the World made an immediate impact on the charts, debuting at number one on the Billboard 200, holding the top spot for four consecutive weeks, and also topping the Top R&B/Hip-Hop Albums chart. "Dear Mama" was released as the album's first single in February 1995 and would be the album's most successful single, topping the Hot Rap Singles chart, and peaking at number nine on the Billboard Hot 100. While he was in prison, the album overtook Bruce Springsteen's Greatest Hits as the best-selling album of the year in the United States at the time. 

Me Against the World was eventually certified double platinum by the Recording Industry Association of America (RIAA). At the 38th Grammy Awards, the album was nominated for Best Rap Album and "Dear Mama" was nominated for Best Rap Solo Performance. The album received acclaimed reviews by critics, being ranked among the best albums of the 1990s. It has been ranked by many critics as one of the greatest hip hop albums, as well as one of the greatest albums of all time. In 2008, the National Association of Recording Merchandisers (NARM), in conjunction with the Rock and Roll Hall of Fame, included Me Against the World in its list of the Definitive 200 Albums of All Time.

Background
By 1994, Tupac Shakur, age 23, was already a prominent and controversial rapper. His second album, Strictly 4 My N.I.G.G.A.Z., going Platinum, had entered the top 25 on the Billboard 200, and offered two Gold singles, "I Get Around" and "Keep Ya Head Up", both entering the top 15 of the Billboard Hot 100. In rapid succession, however, he had become involved in a string of violent encounters.

All for incidents in 1993, Shakur was sentenced to 15 days in jail for assaulting director Allen Hughes while filming Menace II Society, pled guilty to the attempted assault on a rival rapper and saw the charges dropped after he shot two off-duty police officers. Later that year, Shakur and two associates were charged with gang-raping a female fan in Shakur's hotel room, a charge he vehemently denied. In the ensuing trial, Shakur was acquitted of seven felonies, including rape, sodomy and gun charges, but was convicted of two counts of sexual abuse for unwanted touching and was subsequently sentenced to 18 months to 4.5 years in prison. On November 30, 1994, one day before the jury reached their verdict, Shakur was shot and robbed at gunpoint at the lobby of a New York recording studio. He believed the shooting was set up by East Coast associates and collaborators, such as The Notorious B.I.G., Andre Harrell and Sean "Puffy" Combs. 

According to Shakur, Me Against the World aimed to show the hip-hop audience his respect for the art form. Shakur purposefully made Me Against the Worlds lyrics more personal and reflective than previously. This was widely attributed to Shakur's growing maturity and perhaps an effort to reconcile with his troubled past.

Production
Although originally released by Interscope, the album was later released twice by Amaru Entertainment, the label owned by Shakur's mother, Afeni Shakur. The album was recorded at ten different studios, and it was mastered at Bernie Grundman Mastering by Brian Gardner. Several critics found the album's musical production the best on any of Shakur's albums to date.

Steve "Flash" Juon of RapReviews, scoring the production a perfect 10 of 10, particularly praised "So Many Tears" and "Temptations". Jon Pareles of the New York Times called the production a "fatalistic calm, in a commercial mold", and added that "while 2Pac doesn't sing, other voices do, providing smooth melody". Yet James Bernard of Entertainment Weekly, dissenting, complained that Shakur's "vocals are buried deep in the mix. That's a shame—if they were more in-your-face, the lackluster beats might be less noticeable."

Themes

Often depicting the travails of male survival in the ghetto, prominent sentiments include anguish, despair, hopelessness, paranoia, and self-loathing. Such dark tracks, sometimes simultaneously menacing, are "If I Die 2Nite", "Lord Knows", "Outlaw", and "Fuck The World". But there are exceptions. Nostalgic jubilance distinguishes "Old School"—a roster his favorite rap songs, with associated joys, predating his adulthood—while bittersweet optimism occurs in "It Ain't Easy". "Can U Get Away" aims to flirtatiously encourage and lure a romantic interest away from her current, abusive relationship. And the track most popular, "Dear Mama", is a reverent ode to his mother. Throughout the album, Shakur employs various poetical devices, such as alliteration ("If I Die 2Nite") and paired couplets ("Lord Knows").

Release
Me Against the World debuted at number one on the US Billboard 200, selling 210,500 copies in the first week. The album held the top spot for four consecutive weeks. The album also debuted at number one on the US Top R&B/Hip-Hop Albums chart, thus giving 2Pac the first number one album on both R&B and Pop charts. While Shakur was in prison, the album overtook Bruce Springsteen's Greatest Hits as the best-selling album in the United States, a feat which he took pride in. Shakur became the first artist to have a number one album while serving a prison sentence. On December 6, 1995, the album was certified double platinum for sales of over two million copies in the United States.
As of September 2011, the album has sold 3,524,567 copies in the United States.

Shakur's virtual appearance at the annual Coachella Festival (April 15, 2012) led to the album selling 1,000 copies the following week (up by 53% from the previous week).

Singles
"Dear Mama" was released as the album's first single in February 1995, along with the track "Old School" as the B-side. "Dear Mama" would be the album's most successful single, topping the Hot Rap Singles chart, and peaking at No. 9 on the Billboard Hot 100. The single was certified platinum in July 1995, and later placed at No. 51 on the year-end charts.

It was reported that "Can U Get Away" was intended to be released as the next single with a music video directed by Shakur's longtime friend Jada Pinkett. Instead, "So Many Tears" was released as the second single, in June 1995. It reached No. 6 on the Hot Rap Singles chart, and No. 44 on the Billboard Hot 100.

"Temptations," released in August, was the third and final single from the album. The single is the least successful of the three released, but still did fairly well on the charts, reaching No. 68 on the Billboard Hot 100, No. 35 on the Hot R&B/Hip-Hop Singles & Tracks, and No. 13 on the Hot Rap Singles charts.

"Me Against the World", the title track, was released as a single in Europe. It included the Soul Power Remix and the Soul Power Hip Hop Remix.

Critical reception

Me Against the World received critical acclaim. In a contemporary review, Cheo H. Coker at Rolling Stone called the album Shakur's best and said it was "by and large a work of pain, anger and burning desperation — [it] is the first time 2Pac has taken the conflicting forces tugging at his psyche head-on". Jon Pareles, writing in The New York Times, called Shakur the "St. Augustine of gangster rap" due to his ambivalence towards the behavior and nature of the gangster lifestyle. In his review for The Source, the leading hip-hop magazine in the United States, Allen Gordon hailed Shakur as an elite lyricist on display on the album, called it "his best work by far" and noted that "any complaints critics and fans alike had about Tupac's last two albums can be put to rest". He particularly praised the production and lyricism of the "incredible" title track, "So Many Tears", "Temptations", "Heavy in the Game", "Dear Mama" and "Old School", but also noted "It Ain't Easy", "If I Die 2Nite" and "Young Niggaz" as "notable" tracks.

"This may be the first hip-hop blues LP," observed Matt Hall in Select. "Not so much in the music, although the harp blasts owe more to Howlin' Wolf than Tupac's previous two solo efforts, but more with Shakur's vocals, which are at once rebellious and resigned ... Me Against the World is a statement of intent, a note from the depths of America, and a fine, thoughtful LP." In The Guardian, critic Caroline Sullivan observed a "surprisingly optimistic" and thoughtful 2Pac on display on the album, deeming it "worth a listen" despite criticizing the presence of "anodyne" beats and predictable samples.

Jaleel Abdul-Adil of the Chicago Sun-Times stated that "2Pac's latest also mixes toughness and tenderness. Desperation follows raw anger on "Fuck the World" and "It Ain't Easy," but most tracks confess frailties beneath the rapper's tough exterior. "Dear Mama" is a tear-jerking tribute to his mother, "Lord Knows" discloses desperate considerations of suicide, and "So Many Tears" ponders a merciless world that wrecks young lives. 2Pac even includes a sorrowful "shout-out" to Robert Sandifer, the Chicago youth whose brief life ended in a brutal shooting. After earlier releases that lacked focus and consistency, 2Pac finally presents a polished project of self-examination and social commentary. It's ironic that it arrives as his sentence begins."

Some reviewers were less impressed. James Bernard from Entertainment Weekly said, "2Pac does the black-man-backed-into-a-corner routine better than just about anyone because that's largely who he is. When he says it's 'me against the world,' there's an urgency that only comes from experience. On record, the rapper-turned-movie icon’s vocals are buried deep in the mix. That’s a shame-if they were more in-your-face, the lackluster beats might be less noticeable." Robert Christgau of The Village Voice said Shakur witlessly exploited fundamental hip hop themes such as persecution while exhibiting an offensive level of self-pity: "His I-love-Mom rings true because Mom was no saint, and his respect for old G's seems genuine, probably because they told him how smart he was. But whether the metaphor be dead homies or suicide threat, the subtext of his persecution complex is his self-regard."

Reappraisal
Me Against the World was one of Tupac's most acclaimed albums, with many calling it the magnum opus of his career; the work is considered one of the greatest and most influential hip hop albums of all time. In a retrospective review, AllMusic editor Steve Huey dubbed the album "[Shakur's] most thematically consistent, least self-contradicting work", and stated, "it may not be his definitive album, but it just might be his best". Steve "Flash" Juon of RapReviews seemed to feel differently, remarking that the album "is not only the quintessential Shakur album, but one of the most important rap albums released in the 1990s as a whole". On MTV's Greatest Rappers of All Time list, Me Against the World was listed as one of Tupac's "certified classic" albums, along with 2Pacalypse Now, All Eyez on Me and The Don Killuminati: The 7 Day Theory. "One of the best five rap albums ever," remarked Mojo, after Shakur's death.

In 1996, at the 38th Grammy Awards, Me Against the World was nominated for Best Rap Album and the single "Dear Mama" was nominated for Best Rap Solo Performance. Me Against the World won Best Rap Album at the 1996 Soul Train Music Awards. In 2008, the National Association of Recording Merchandisers, in conjunction with the Rock and Roll Hall of Fame, recognized Me Against the World as one of the "most influential and popular albums", ranking it number 170 on a list of 200 other albums by artists of various musical genres. The album was also included in the book 1001 Albums You Must Hear Before You Die.

 The information regarding accolades is adapted from Acclaimed Music, except for lists that are sourced otherwise.
 (*) signifies unordered lists

Track listing 
Credits adapted from the album's liner notes.

 Notes
 Additional Vocals on "Lord Knows" performed by Natasha Walker
 Background Vocals on "F*** the World" performed by Shock G
 Background Vocals on "Me Against the World" performed by Puff Johnson
 Background Vocals on "So Many Tears" performed by Thug Life, Digital Underground & Stretch
  signifies a co-producer.
  signifies an additional producer.

Sample Credits
 "If I Die 2Nite" contains samples from:
 "Tonight Is the Night", written by Betty Wright and Willie Clarke, as recorded by Betty Wright.
 "Tonight", written by Norman Durham, as recorded by Kleeer.
 "Deep Cover (187)", written by Calvin Broadus, Colin Wolfe, and Andre Young, as recorded by Dr. Dre.
 "Me Against the World" contains samples from:
 "Walk On By", written by Burt Bacharach and Hal David, as recorded by Isaac Hayes.
 "Inside My Love", written by Minnie Riperton, Richard Rudolph, and Leon Ware, as recorded by Minnie Riperton.
 "So Many Tears" contains a sample from "That Girl", written and recorded by Stevie Wonder.
 "Temptations" contains samples from:
 "Computer Love", written by Roger Troutman, Larry Troutman, and Shirley Murdock, as recorded by Zapp.
 "Watch Your Nuggets", written by Reggie Noble, George Clinton, Garry Shider, and David Spradley, as recorded by Redman & Erick Sermon.
 "Young Niggaz" contains an interpolation of "She's Strange", written by Nathan Leftenat, Charles Singleton, Tomi Jenkins, and Larry Blackmon.
 "Dear Mama" contains:
 a sample from "In All My Wildest Dreams", written and recorded by Joe Sample.
 an interpolation of "Sadie", written by Joseph B. Jefferson, Bruce Hawes, and Charles Simmons.
 "Can U Get Away" contains an interpolation of "Happy Feelin's", written by Frankie Beverly.
 "Old School" contains samples from:
 "We Share", written by John Buchanan and Donald Tilery, as recorded by the Soul Searchers.
 "Dedication", written by Maxwell Nixon, as recorded by Brand Nubian.

Personnel
Credits for Me Against the World adapted from AllMusic

 2Pac -  composer, primary artist, vocals 
 Eric Altenburger - art direction, design
 Kim Armstrong - vocals (background)
 Paul Arnold - engineer, Mixing
 Burt Bacharach - composer
 Eric Baker - composer
 Larry Blackmon - composer
 Sam Bostic - composer, producer
 George Clinton - composer
 Hal David - composer
 Kevin "KD" Davis - engineer, mixing
 Digital Underground - guest artist
 Dramacydal - guest artist, performer, primary artist
 Easy Mo Bee - composer
 Eboni Foster - vocals (background)
 Reggie Green - vocals (background)
 Jeff Griffin - mixing
 Greg Jacobs - composer
 Gregory Jacobs - composer
 Johnny J - composer
 Puff Johnson - guest artist, vocals (background)
 Lady Levi - guest artist
 Jay Lean - engineer, mixing
 Eric Lynch - engineer
 Moe Z - composer
 Bob Morris - engineer
 Mike Mosley - composer
 Shirley Murdock - composer
 Tim Nitz - engineer
 Tony "D" Pizarro - composer, engineer, mixing, producer
 Richie Rich - guest artist
 Minnie Riperton - composer, vocals (background)
 Roger - composer
 Jill Rose - vocals
 Richard Rudolph - composer
 Joe Sample - composer
 Garry Shider - composer
 Charlie Singleton - composer
 David Spradley - composer
 Thug Life - guest artist
 Larry Troutman - composer
 Le-Morrious "Funky Drummer" Tyler - composer
 Ronnie Vann - guitar
 Natasha Walker - guest artist, vocals (background)
 Leon Ware - composer
 Brian Gardner - Mastering
 Stevie Wonder - composer

Charts

Weekly charts

Year-end charts

Certifications

See also
 List of number-one albums of 1995 (U.S.)
 List of number-one R&B albums of 1995 (U.S.)

References
Footnotes

Bibliography

External links
 

1995 albums
Albums produced by Easy Mo Bee
Albums produced by Johnny "J"
Albums produced by Soulshock and Karlin
Amaru Entertainment albums
Atlantic Records albums
Interscope Records albums
Jive Records albums
Tupac Shakur albums